The Enemy Within is a 1918 Australian silent film starring renowned Australian sportsman Snowy Baker in his first screen role.

Unlike many Australian silent movies, it is possible to see the full film today.

Synopsis
Jack Airlie is a secret agent who has worked for four years abroad. He returns to Australia after four years away and falls for Myree Brew, beautiful daughter of his oldest friend, Mrs Drew. Rich businessman Henry Brasels is also in love with Myree.

Brasels is running a gang of German saboteurs, including radical leader Bill Warne, who is planning to set off a series of bombs. Brasels lures Jack into a trap but he manages to escape with the help of his sidekick, detective Jimmy cook. Brasels kidnaps Myee and tries to get on board a German ship. however Jack manages to climb down a steep cliff and rescue her, as the Coastal Patrol capture Warne and Warne.

Cast
Snowy Baker as Jack Airlie
John Faulkner as Henry Brasels
Lily Molloy as Myree Drew
Nellie Calvin as Claire Lerode
Billy Ryan as Bill Warne
Sandy McVea as Jimmy Cook
Lily Rochefort as Mrs Drew
Gerald Harcourt as Glassop
Marjory Donovan as the child

Production
The film was specifically concocted a vehicle for Snowy Baker, with plenty of action sequences to demonstrate his physical prowess, including climbing down a 300-foot cliff, leaping from a moving car, diving 80-foot into Sydney harbour at Coogee Bay and hand-to-hand fighting.

The story was partly inspired by the real-life raid of the SMS Wolf in the Pacific during World War I, and the sinking of the Cumberland off Gabo Island. The villains were based on the Industrial Workers of the World, and shown to be operating in Sydney high society.

Filming started in December 1917. The director, Roland Stavely, was a stage director for J. C. Williamson Ltd.

The part of Snowy Baker's assistant was played by Sandy McVea, an aboriginal boxer.

Release
The film was specifically advertised as "not a war picture but a thrilling drama of a special agent's fight against spies in Australia". It was a hit and led to a number of action movies starring Baker.

A novelised version of the script was published in 1919.

References

External links

The Enemy Within at Australian Screen Online
The Enemy Within at the National Film and Sound Archive
Example of a contemporary newspaper ad for the film

1918 films
Australian drama films
Australian silent feature films
Australian black-and-white films
1918 drama films
Silent drama films